Florence Correctional Center (FCC) is a medium-security prison for men in Florence, Arizona, owned by CoreCivic (formally, Corrections Corporation of America). The current contracts that the company holds at this location are U.S. Immigration and Customs Enforcement (ICE), United States Marshal Service (USMS), and City of Mesa.
Opened in 1999, the current capacity of the facility is 1824. Roughly 550 beds are for ICE detainees  Nearly 1234 beds are for the Marshal Service and about 80 for the City of Mesa.

In 2005, CCA contracted with the Alaska Department of Corrections to keep more than 30% of the state's inmates in FCC.  Many of these Alaskans were detainees awaiting trial.  Eventually this contract was finished.
In 2017, the City of Mesa became the first city in Arizona to allow the private prison to house misdemeanor offenders. Of course this led to some backlash, but the city reassured citizens that this would in-fact save the city money. Approximately $2 Million per year. The city and CoreCivic agreed to 3 years.
The prison is one of several state, federal and private prisons in Florence.

References

Prisons in Arizona
Buildings and structures in Pinal County, Arizona
CoreCivic
Florence, Arizona
1999 establishments in Arizona
Immigration detention centers and prisons in the United States
U.S. Immigration and Customs Enforcement